Marmoutier Abbey may refer to:

 Marmoutier Abbey, Alsace
 Marmoutier Abbey, Tours